Pessin is a municipality in the Havelland district, in Brandenburg, Germany.

Demography

References

External links
Municipal assoc. Friesack / town Pessin (German)
Pessin-Online (German)

Localities in Havelland